The 2004 Indian general election in Delhi, occurred for 7 seats in the state.

List of Elected MPs

See also 

 Indian general election, 2004 (Jammu and Kashmir)

Delhi
Indian general elections in Delhi
2000s in Delhi